Puerto Rico Highway 577 (PR-577) is a short tertiary mountainous state road that connects PR-143 (also known as Ruta Panorámica [Scenic Route] in this sector) to the Cerro Maravilla communications towers, in Barrio Anón, Ponce, Puerto Rico. The road's northern terminus is at the Cerro Maravilla communications towers atop the Cerro Maravilla mountain, and its southern terminus is at its intersection with PR-143.

Route description

PR-577 is a short road, approximately one-quarter mile in length. The road's primary purpose is to provide access to the television, radio and telephone communications towers located at the top of the Cerro Maravilla mountain. The road is somewhat steep, but it is safe to climb it in an automobile. Care must be exercised, however, if using the road while raining. It is an asphalt road. The road is not a full two-lane road but, instead, as it is the case with many of Puerto Rico's mountain roads, it is approximately 1 and 1/2 lanes wide. As a result, if traveling this road in a vehicle, it is necessary to reduce the speed to almost a crawl when another vehicle is approaching in the opposite direction.

Significance
The Cerro Maravilla mountain gained notoriety in Puerto Rico and internationally as the site where Puerto Rico Police ambushed two young Puerto Rican independence advocates  in 1978, murdering both, in an incident now known as the Cerro Maravilla murders. The men, aged 18 and 23, had been lured to the place by an undercover police agent to attempt to destroy the communications towers in an effort to call attention to the incarceration of Puerto Rican political prisoners in the United States. The killing of the two men was covered up by the Puerto Rico Police and several high-level Puerto Rico government officials, and were not investigated diligently by the FBI, for which a later FBI director apologized.

Major intersections

See also

 List of highways in Ponce, Puerto Rico
 List of highways numbered 577

References

External links

 
 Guía de Carreteras Principales, Expresos y Autopistas 

577
Roads in Ponce, Puerto Rico